The Philokalia (from  philia "love" and  kallos "beauty") is "a collection of texts written between the 4th and 15th centuries by spiritual masters" of the mystical hesychast tradition of the Eastern Orthodox Church. They were originally written for the guidance and instruction of monks in "the practice of the contemplative life". The collection was compiled in the 18th century by Nicodemus the Hagiorite and Macarius of Corinth based on the codices 472 (12th century), 605 (13th century), 476 (14th century), 628 (14th century) and 629 (15th century) from the library of the monastery of Vatopedi, Mount Athos.

Although these works were individually known in the monastic culture of Greek Orthodox Christianity before their inclusion in the Philokalia, their presence in this collection resulted in a much wider readership due to its translation into several languages. The earliest translations included a Church Slavonic language translation of selected texts by Paisius Velichkovsky (Dobrotolublye, Добротолю́бїе) in 1793, a Russian translation by Ignatius Bryanchaninov in 1857, and a five-volume translation into Russian (Dobrotolyubie) by Theophan the Recluse in 1877. There were subsequent Romanian, Italian, French, German, Spanish, Finnish and Arabic translations.

The book is the "principal spiritual text" for all the Eastern Orthodox churches. The publishers of the current English translation state that "the Philokalia has exercised an influence far greater than that of any book other than the Bible in the recent history of the Orthodox Church."

Philokalia (sometimes Philocalia) is also the name given to an anthology of the writings of Origen compiled by Basil of Caesarea and Gregory of Nazianzus. Other works on monastic spirituality have also used the same title over the years.

History
Nikodemos and Makarios were monks at Mount Athos, a mountainous peninsula in northern Greece, historically considered the geographical center of Orthodox spirituality and home to 20 monasteries. The first edition, in Greek, was published in Venice in 1782, with a second Greek edition published in Athens in 1893. All the original texts were in Greek—two of them were first written in Latin and translated into Greek in the Byzantine era.

Paisius Velichkovsky's translation into Church Slavonic, Dobrotolublye (published in Moscow in 1793), included selected portions of the Philokalia and was the version that the pilgrim in The Way of a Pilgrim carried on his journey. That book about a Russian pilgrim who is seeking advice on interior prayer helped popularize the Philokalia and its teachings in Russia. Velichkovsky's translation was the first to become widely read by the public, away from the monasteries—helped by the popularity of The Way of a Pilgrim, and the public influence of the startsy at Optina Monastery known as the Optina Elders. Two Russian language translations appeared in the 19th century, one by Ignatius Brianchaninov (1857) and another by Theophan the Recluse's Dobrotolubiye (1877). The latter was published in five volumes and included texts that were not in the original Greek edition.

Velichkovsky was initially hesitant to share his translation outside of the Optina Monastery walls. He was concerned that people living in the world would not have the adequate supervision and guidance of the startsy in the monastery, nor would they have the support of the liturgical life of the monks. He was finally persuaded by the Metropolitan of St. Petersburg to publish the book in 1793. Brianchanivov expressed the same concerns in his work, warning his readers that regular practice of the Jesus Prayer, without adequate guidance, could potentially cause spiritual delusion and pride, even among monks. Their concerns were contrary to the original compiler of the Philokalia, Nicodemos, who wrote that the Jesus Prayer could be used to good effect by anyone, whether monastic or layperson. All agreed that the teachings on constant inner prayer should be practiced under the guidance of a spiritual teacher, or starets.

The first partial English and French translations in the 1950s were an indirect result of the Bolshevik revolution, which brought many Russian intellectuals into Western Europe. T. S. Eliot persuaded his fellow directors of the publishing house Faber and Faber to publish a partial translation into English from the Theophan Russian version, which met with surprising success in 1951. A more complete English translation, from the original Greek, began in 1979 with a collaboration between G. E. H. Palmer, Kallistos Ware, and Philip Sherrard. They released four of the five volumes of the Philokalia between 1979 and 1995. In 1946, the first installment of a ten volume Romanian translation by Father Dumitru Stăniloae appeared. In addition to the original Greek text, Stăniloae added "lengthy original footnotes of his own" as well as substantially expanding the coverage of texts by Saint John of the Ladder, Saint Dorotheos of Gaza, Maximus the Confessor, Symeon the New Theologian, and Gregory Palamas. This work is 4,650 pages in length. Writings by the Trappist monk Thomas Merton on hesychasm also helped spread the popularity of the Philokalia, along with the indirect influence of J. D. Salinger's Franny and Zooey, which featured The Way of a Pilgrim as a main plot element.

Teachings
The collection's title is The Philokalia of the Niptic Fathers, or more fully The Philokalia of the Neptic Saints gathered from our Holy Theophoric Father, through which, by means of the philosophy of ascetic practice and contemplation, the intellect is purified, illumined, and made perfect. Niptic is an adjective derived from the Greek Nipsis (or Nepsis) referring to contemplative prayer and meaning "watchfulness". Watchfulness in this context includes close attention to one's thoughts, intentions, and emotions, with the aim of resisting temptations and vain and egoistic thoughts, and trying to maintain a constant state of remembrance of God. There are similarities between this ancient practice and the concept of mindfulness as practiced in Buddhism and other spiritual traditions. The Philokalia teachings have also influenced the revival of interior prayer in modern times through the centering prayer practices taught by Thomas Keating and Thomas Merton.

Philokalia is defined as the "love of the beautiful, the exalted, the excellent, understood as the transcendent source of life and the revelation of Truth." In contemplative prayer the mind becomes absorbed in the awareness of God as a living presence as the source of being of all creatures and sensible forms. According to the authors of the English translation, Kallistos Ware, G. E. H. Palmer, and Philip Sherrard, the writings of the Philokalia have been chosen above others because they:
...show the way to awaken and develop attention and consciousness, to attain that state of watchfulness which is the hallmark of sanctity. They describe the conditions most effective for learning what their authors call the art of arts and the science of sciences, a learning which is not a matter of information or agility of mind but of a radical change of will and heart leading man towards the highest possibilities open to him, shaping and nourishing the unseen part of his being, and helping him to spiritual fulfilment and union with God."

The Philokalia is the foundational text on hesychasm ("quietness" or "stillness"), an inner spiritual tradition with a long history dating back to the Desert Fathers. The practices include contemplative prayer, quiet sitting, and recitation of the Jesus Prayer. While traditionally taught and practiced in monasteries, hesychasm teachings have spread over the years to include laymen. Nikodemos, in his introduction, described the collected texts as "a mystical school of inward prayer" which could be used to cultivate the inner life and to "attain the measure of the stature of the fullness of Christ." While the monastic life makes this easier, Nikodemos himself stressed that "unceasing prayer" should be practiced by all.

The hesychast teachings in the Philokalia are viewed by Orthodox Christians as inseparable from the sacraments and liturgy of the Orthodox Church, and are given by and for those who are already living within the framework of the Church. A common theme is the need for a spiritual father or guide.

Timeline of editions and translations

 4th-15th centuries The original texts are written by various spiritual masters. Most are written in Greek, two are written in Latin and translated into Greek during Byzantine times.
 1782 First edition, Greek, published in Venice, compiled by Nikodemos and Makarios.
 1793 Church Slavonic translation of selected texts, Dobrotolublye, by Paisius Velichkovsky, published in Moscow. This translation was carried by the pilgrim in The Way of a Pilgrim. First to be read outside of monasteries, with a strong influence on the two following Russian translations. 
 1857 Russian language translation, by Ignatius Brianchaninov.
 1877 Russian language translation, by Theophan the Recluse, included several texts not in the Greek original, and omitted or paraphrased some passages.
 1893 Second Greek edition, published in Athens, included additional texts by Patriarch Kallistos.
 1946-1976 In 1946, the first installment of a twelve volume Romanian translation by Father Dumitru Stăniloae appeared.
 1951, 1954 First partial English translations by E. Kadloubovsky and G. E. H. Palmer in two volumes: Writings from the Philokalia on Prayer of the Heart and Early Fathers from the Philokalia. These were translated from Theophane's Russian version, and published by Faber and Faber.
 1953 "Small Philokalia" is published in French: Petite Philocalie de la prière du cœur (ed. Jean Gouillard, Points / Sagesses)
 1957-1963 Third Greek edition, published in Athens by Astir Publishing Company in five volumes. Modern English translation based on this edition.
 1963 Parts of the Philokalia is published in Italian for the first time (La filocalia. Testi di ascetica e mistica della Chiesa orientale, Giovanni Vannucci, Libreria Editrice Fiorentina, Firenze)
 1965 First translation of selected texts from Philokalia is published in Finnish by name Sisäinen kauneus. Rukousta koskevia poimintoja Filokaliasta. (Inner Beauty. Selected texts from the Philokalia on Prayer.) from German translation of Kleine Philokalie. The translation was made by Irinja Nikkanen and it was published by Pyhäin Sergein ja Hermanin veljeskunta (Brotherhood of sts. Sergius and Herman).
 1979-1995 English translation by Kallistos Ware, G. E. H. Palmer, and Philip Sherrard, of the first four of the five Greek volumes, from the Third Greek edition. This was published by Faber and Faber.
 1981-1993 A Finnish translation was made from the original Byzantine Greek text by Valamon ystävät ry (Friends of Valamo monastery registered association) in four volumes. Translation was made by nun Kristoduli, Irinja Nikkanen and Matti Jeskanen. An appendix (fifth volume) by nun Kristoduli was published at 1998.
 1982-1987 An Italian translation by M. Benedetta Artioli and M. Francesca Lovato of the Community of Monteveglio and P. Gribaudi is published in Turin in four volumes.
 1988 Little Philokalia on prayer of heart (Piccola filocalia della preghiera del cuore) in Italian is translated by Jean Gouillard and published in Milan.
 1998 A Polish translation of Philokalia by Józef Naumowicz is published in Kraków.
 2020 An English translation by Anna Skoubourdis of the fifth volume of the Philokalia is published by Virgin Mary of Australia and Oceania.

Contents
This listing of texts is based on the English translation of four volumes by Bishop Kallistos Ware, G. E. H. Palmer, and Philip Sherrard. Some works in the Philokalia are also found in the Patrologia Graecae and Patrologia Latina of J. P. Migne.

Volume 1 
St. Isaiah the Solitary
On Guarding the Intellect: 27 Texts

Evagrius the Solitary
Outline Teaching on Asceticism and Stillness in the Solitary
Texts on Discrimination in respect of Passions and Thoughts
Extracts from the Texts on Watchfulness
On Prayer: 153 Texts

St. John Cassian
On the Eight Vices: Written for Bishop Kastor
On Control of the Stomach
On the Demon of Unchastity and the Desire of the Flesh
On Avarice
On Anger
On Dejection
On Listlessness
On Self-Esteem
On Pride
On the Holy Fathers of Sketis and on Discrimination: Written for Abba Leontios

St. Mark the Ascetic
On the Spiritual Law: 200 Texts
On Those who Think that They are Made Righteous by Works: 226 Texts
Letter to Nicolas the Solitary

St. Hesychios the Priest
On Watchfulness and Holiness: Written for Theodoulos

St. Neilos the Ascetic
Ascetic Discourse

St. Diadochos of Photiki
On Spiritual Knowledge and Discrimination: 100 Texts

St. John of Karpathos
For the Encouragement of the Monks in India who had Written to Him: 100 Texts
Ascetic Discourse Sent at the Request of the Same Monks in India: A Supplement to the 100 Texts

St. Antony the Great
On the Character of Men and on the Virtuous Life: 170 Texts
This piece by Anthony was changed to an appendix in the English translation by Palmer, Sherrard, and Ware (1979, p. 327), because of their view that the language and the general idea is not explicitly Christian and may not have been written by Antony.

Volume 2 
St. Theodoros the Great Ascetic
A Century of Spiritual Texts
Theoretikon
St. Maximos the Confessor
Four Hundred Texts on Love, with a foreword to Elpidios the Presbyter
Two Hundred Texts on Theology and the Incarnate Dispensation of the Son of God (written for Thalassios)
Various Texts on Theology, the Divine Economy, and Virtue and Vice
On the Lord's Prayer

On Love, Self Control, and Life in accordance with the Intellect (written for Paul the Presbyter)
St. John of Damascus
On the Virtues and the Vices
A Discourse on Abba Philemon
St. Theognostos
On the Practice of the Virtues, Contemplation and the Priesthood

Volume 3 
St. Philotheos of Sinai
Forty Texts on Watchfulness
Ilias the Presbyter
A Gnomic Anthology: Part I
A Gnomic Anthology: Part II
A Gnomic Anthology: Part III
A Gnomic Anthology: Part IV
Theophanis the Monk
The Ladder of Divine Graces
St. Peter of Damascus
Book I: A Treasury of Divine Knowledge
Introduction
The Seven Forms of Bodily Discipline
The Seven Commandments
The Four Virtues of the Soul
Active Spiritual Knowledge
The Bodily Virtues as Tools for the Acquisition of the Virtues of the Soul
The Guarding of the Intellect
Obedience and Stillness
The Eight Stages of Contemplation
The First Stage of Contemplation
The Second Stage of Contemplation
The Third Stage of Contemplation
The Fourth Stage of Contemplation
The Fifth Stage of Contemplation
The Sixth Stage of Contemplation
The Seventh Stage of Contemplation
The Eighth Stage of Contemplation
That there are No Contradictions in Holy Scripture
The Classification of Prayer according to the Eight Stages of Contemplation
Humility
Dispassion
A Further Analysis of the Seven Forms of Bodily Discipline
Discrimination
Spiritual Reading
True Discrimination
That we should not Despair even if we Sin Many Times
Short Discourse on the Acquisition of the Virtues and on Abstinence from the Passions
How to Acquire True Faith
That Stillness is of Great Benefit to those Subject to Passion
The Great Benefit ofTrue Repentance
God's Universal and Particular Gifts
How God has done All Things for our Benefit
How God's Speech is not Loose Chatter
How it is Impossible to be Saved without Humility
On Building up the Soul through the Virtues
The Great Value of Love and of Advice given with Humility
That the Frequent Repetition found in Divine Scripture is not Verbosity
Spurious Knowledge
A List of the Virtues
A List of the Passions
The Difference between Thoughts and Provocations
Book II: Twenty-Four Discourses
Spiritual Wisdom
The Two Kinds of Faith
The Two Kinds of Fear
True Piety and Self-Control
Patient Endurance
Hope
Detachment
Mortification of the Passions
The Remembrance of Christ's Sufferings
Humility
Discrimination
Contemplation of the Sensible World
Knowledge of the Angelic Orders
Dispassion
Love
Knowledge of God
Moral Judgment
Self-Restraint
Courage
Justice
Peace
Joy
Holy Scripture
Conscious Awareness in the Heart 
St. Symeon the Metaphrast: Paraphrases of the Homilies of St. Macarius of Egypt
Spiritual Perfection
Prayer
Patient Endurance and Discrimination
The Raising of the Intellect
Love
The Freedom of the Intellect

Volume 4 
St. Symeon the New Theologian
On Faith
153 Practical and Theological Texts
The Three Methods of Prayer [attributed to him]
Nikitas Stithatos
On the Practice of the Virtues: One Hundred Texts
On the Inner Nature of Things and on the Purification of the Intellect: One Hundred Texts
On Spiritual Knowledge, Love and the Perfection of Living: One Hundred Texts
Theoliptos, Metropolitan of Philadelphia
On Inner Work in Christ and the Monastic Profession
Texts
Nikiphoros the Monk
On Watchfulness and the Guarding of the Heart
From the Life of Our Holy Father Antony
From the Life of St Theodosios the Cenobiarch
From the Life of St Arsenios
From the Life of St Paul of Mount Latros
From the Life of St Savvas
From the Life of Abba Agathon
From Abba Mark's Letter to Nicolas
From St John Klimakos
From St Isaiah the Solitary
From St Makarios the Great
From St Diadochos
From St Isaac the Syrian
From St John of Karpathos
From St Symeon the New Theologian
From Nikiphoros Himself
St. Gregory of Sinai
On Commandments and Doctrines, Warnings and Promises; on Thoughts, Passions and Virtues, and also on Stillness and Prayer: 137 Texts
Further Texts
On Passion-Imbued Change
On Beneficent Change
On Morbid Defluxions
On the Signs of Grace and Delusion, Written for the Confessor Longinos: Ten Texts
On How to Discover the Energy of the Holy Spirit
On the Different Kinds of Energy
On Divine Energy
On Delusion
On Stillness: Fifteen Texts
Two Ways of Prayer
the Beginning of Watchfulness
Different Ways of Psalmodizing
On Prayer: Seven Texts
How the Hesychast Should Sit for Prayer and Not Rise Again Too Quickly
How to Say the Prayer
How to Master the Intellect in Prayer
How to Expel Thoughts
How to Psalmodize
How to Partake of Food
On Delusion and Other Subjects
St. Gregory Palamas
To the Most Reverend Nun Xenia
A New Testament Decalogue
In Defence of Those who Devoutly Practise a Life of Stillness
Three Texts on Prayer and Purity of Heart
Topics of Natural and Theological Science and on the Moral and Ascetic Life: 150 Texts
The Declaration of the Holy Mountain in Defence of Those who Devoutly Practice a Life of Stillness

Volume 5 
This volume was published in English translation in 2020. These are the contents of the modern Greek translation.

Kallistos and Ignatios Xanthopoulos
Method and precise canon for those who choose the hesychastic and monastic life: 100 chapters

Kefalaia (Chapters): 81 chapters
Kallistos Tilikoudis (presumed the same as Kallistos Angelikoudis)
On Hesychastic Practice
Kallistos Katafygiotis (presumed the same as Kallistos Angelikoudis)
On union with God, and Life of Theoria
Saint Simeon, Archbishop of Thessaloniki
Chapters on the Sacred and Deifying prayer
Saint Mark the Gentle
On the Words that are Contained in the Sacred Prayer
Anonymous
Interpretation of "Kyrie Eleison" (Lord Have Mercy)
Saint Simeon the New Theologian
Discourse on Faith and teaching for those who say that it is not possible for those who find themselves in the worries of the world to reach the perfection of the virtues, and narration that is beneficial at the beginning.
On the Three Ways of Prayer
St. Gregory of Sinai
Excerpts from the life of St. Maximos Kapsokalivis
All Christians Must Pray Uninterruptedly
Indices

Translations

See also
Lovingkindness
Poustinia
Hermit

References

Further reading
 Paschalis M. Kitromilides, "Philokalia's first journey?" in Idem, An Orthodox Commonwealth: Symbolic Legacies and Cultural Encounters in Southeastern Europe (Aldershot, 2007) (Variorum Collected Studies Series: CS891).
 Bingaman B & Nassif B (eds) (2012) The Philokalia. A Classic Text of Orthodox Spirituality. Oxford: Oxford University Press.

External links

Quotes from the Philokalia at Orthodox Church Quotes
  The Philokalia digitized (PDF)
An historical survey of the Philokalia by Rev Prof Andrew Louth
 Volume 3 at archive.org

 
18th-century Eastern Orthodoxy
1782 anthologies
Hesychast literature
18th-century Christian texts
Christian monasticism
Christian mysticism
Prayer